Blanche Gardin (born 3 April 1977) is a French actress, comedian and writer.

Gardin holds a Master of Sociology degree from the Paris Nanterre University.

One-woman shows

Filmography

Television

Author

References

External links 

1977 births
Living people
People from Suresnes
21st-century French actresses
French television actresses
French film actresses
French stage actresses
21st-century French women writers